Kurtoğlu is a Turkish name. In old times it was a patronymic lakap (epithet) meaning "son of Kurt", from the Turkish first name "Kurt". The latter name literally means "wolf" in Turkish. In modern times the epithet has become a surname. Notable people with this epithet or surname include:

Epithet
 Kurtoğlu Hızır Reis, Ottoman admiral
 Kurtoğlu Muslihiddin Reis (1487–c. 1530), Ottoman privateer and admiral

Surname
 Aydın Kurtoğlu (born 1983), Turkish musician
 Cengiz Kurtoğlu (born 1959), Turkish musician
 Ermal Kurtoğlu (born 1980), Albanian-Turkish basketball player

Turkish masculine given names
Turkish-language surnames